Bishop Cotton School is a boarding school for boys aged 7-18 years old in Shimla, Himachal Pradesh. It is one of the oldest boarding schools for boys in Asia, having been founded on 28 July 1859 by Bishop George Edward Lynch Cotton. Bishop Cotton also founded the Bishop Cotton School in Nagpur. The alumni of Bishop Cotton are known as Old Cottonians. The Bishop Cotton School, Shimla celebrated 150 years of existence in 2009.

The school has produced army officers, ambassadors, judges, ministers, authors, actors, artists and politicians.

Bishop Cotton School has been ranked among the best boys-only residential schools of India by media such as The Times of India, Outlook, and Education World.

History
Bishop George Edward Lynch Cotton was a scholar of Westminster, and a graduate of Cambridge University. In 1836 he was appointed Assistant Master at Rugby School by Doctor Thomas Arnold, one of the founders of the British public school system. It was the young Mr. Cotton who was spoken of as 'the model young master' in Thomas Hughe's famous book 'Tom Brown's School Days'. The school opened for students on 15 March 1863. Though mentioned in correspondence as the Simla Public School, it never actually bore this name. The first boy, Frederick Naylor, joined the school on 16 March 1863. Bishop Cotton reconnoitred ten sites in September and October 1864, and finally approved the South end of Knollswood Spur which belonged to the Rajah of Keonthal. After negotiations the site was acquired through the intervention of the Viceroy and the foundation stone for the new buildings was laid on 26 September 1866, by the Viceroy, Sir John Lawrence, brother of Sir Henry Lawrence, founder of the famous Lawrence School, Sanawar. In September 1868, the school moved to Knollswood, the present site. Bishop Cotton was inspired by the phrase, "Overcome Evil With Good" from Romans 12:21.

Head Masters
source:

The Rev. S. Slater D.D. (1863-1885)
The Rev. H.M. Robinson (1885-1886)
The Rev. E.A. Iron MA (1887-1901)
The Rev. H.M. Lewis MA (1901-1918)
The Rev. R.R. Gillespy (1919-1922)
The Rev. W.S. O’Neil MA (1923-1926)
The Rev. J.R. Peacy MA, MC (1927-1935)
The Rev. Canon G. Sinker MA (1935-1945)
The Rev. F.M. Drake BA, BT (1946-1949)
Mr. F.H. Fisher BA, BT (1949-1953)
Mr. E.G. Carter OBE, MA (1956-1957)
Dr. T.M. Dustan, MA, BD, DD (1958-1962)
Major R.K. Von Goldstein MBE, MA (1963-1976)
Brig. S.J. Mukand MA LT, DP Ed (1976-1986)
Mr. R.N. Hakim MA LT (1986-1993)
Mr. Kabir Mustafi MA, B.Ed. (1994-2004)
Mr. Roy Christopher Robinson M.A, B.Ed., T.T.C (2004-2019)
Mr. Simon Weale M.A Oxon (Current)

School organisation

House system
The four houses are named after people who provided financial help to the school after The Great Fire of 1905.

House Masters
In the Junior School, from classes III to V, pastoral requirements are met and control and supervision of the boys is done by the matrons who live next to the boys in the dormitories. The children have class teachers who function like house tutors for the children of their classes.

Prefectorial System
Bishop Cotton School was again the first school in India to start the Prefectorial System. Today, the school authorities consist of the four house captains, the school captain, and the school prefect.

Curriculum
The school has its own curriculum for classes III to VIII. Classes IX to XII follow the CISCE syllabus.

Every boy goes on for tertiary education at the end of year XII, and the success rate for the board examination is usually 100%. The teaching system is backed by a remedial address system, and since the boys and staff are residents, every teacher is accessible at any time if a child seeks help. The school has provisions for helping children with special needs. The school runs The Learning Centre, which is an education centre for non-resident, intellectually-challenged children of Shimla town.

Buildings and grounds

The staff are housed in Linlithgow house. Next to this is the Holy Trinity Chapel and between them is Canning Gate and Lawrence Gate which can be identified with The Lawrence School, Sanawar crest bearing the legend "Be ready". Viceroy Lawrence laid the foundation stone of the school at the present site.

Facing the main school building are Rivaz, Ibbetson and Lefroy dormitory houses. Curzon dormitory house is at the right back end. Opposite Lefroy is the War Memorial and Museum with a cannon and an aircraft further along. Between Lefroy and the War Memorial is an arched hedge that leads past a tiny rose garden to the Headmaster's Lodge and the Lady Willingdon Swimming Bath. In front of the porch is a fountain commemorating Sardar Sohan Singh.

The main hall of the school is Irwin Hall. Behind this is the Senior Master's Lodge to the left of which is the park and to its right Litster Hall and the laboratories. Sports facilities include the Bawa Squash Courts and Shankar Hall for indoor badminton.

Dormitories
From classes 3 to 8 the boys live in dormitories under the care and supervision of Matrons, boys of the same age group are together. The Remove Building commemorates Ronald and Zoe Hakim (Staff 1969–86; HM: 1987–94). Each dormitory has about 34 boys. Class III and IV lives in Linlithgow, Class V lives in Iron's Dormitory, Class VI lives in Sinker Dormitory, VII lives Stooks and Class VIII lives in Lewis Dormitory. Dormitory From class IX the boys move up to the Main School, which dates back to the 1860s, and live in their Houses with all boys of a particular house together. They are under the direct control and supervision of their House Masters, Captains and Prefects.

Old Cottonians Association
The Old Cottonians Association was started in 1910 when 17 Old Cottonians assembled in the Freemason's Hall in Shimla. The Old Cottonians Association is spread all over the world.

Notable alumni
 Colonel Reginald Edward Harry Dyer, The Butcher of Amritsar
 General Akhtar Abdur Rahman, military governor of Baluchistan and head of Inter-Services Intelligence, Pakistan
 Sir Palden Thondup Namgyal 12th and the last king of Kingdom of Sikkim
 David Sadleir, former Australian diplomat and 9th Director-General of Security, Australia
 Jigme Palden Dorji (Rivaz 1936–38), 1st Prime Minister of Bhutan
 Melville de Mellow, Padma Shri, Prix Italia, broadcaster (Ibbetson 1925–29)
 DIG Simranjit Singh Mann, MP, Punjab (Ibbetson 1951–61)
 William Kirkpatrick, MP for Preston (Conservative), 1931 (1891–96)
 Major Roy Farran, DSO, MC with Two Bars, served with 3rd Squadron, 2 SAS (Curzon 1932–34)
 Fali Nariman, Senior Advocate Supreme Court of India, MP (Rajya Sabha), Padma Bhushan (Ibbetson 1942–44)
 Virbhadra Singh (Ibbetson 1947–51), former Chief Minister of the Indian state of Himachal Pradesh, member of the Indian National Congress
 A. S. Dulat, former R&AW chief
 Montek Singh Ahluwalia, Indian economic policy-maker, Cabinet Minister
 Lieutenant General N C Rawlley, former Vice Chief of the Army Staff
 H. S. Bedi, Justice, Supreme Court of India
 Sukhpal Singh Khaira, member of the Legislative Assembly, Punjab, India
 Ruskin Bond, Padma Shri, Indian author, awarded Padma Shri in 1999 for contributions to children's literature
 Jeev Milkha Singh, Indian professional golfer who became the first player from India to join the European Tour in 1998, and four-time winner on European Tour
 Kumar Gaurav, actor
 Lalit Modi, chairman and Commissioner of IPL
 Bob Singh Dhillon, Indo-Canadian multi-millionaire businessman
 Ratan Tata, business tycoon
 Junaid Azim Mattu, politician and mayor of Srinagar
 Mayank Dagar, Indian cricketer
 Tarsem Singh Dhandwar, director
 Benjamin Gilani, actor
 Lieutenant General Dewan Prem Chand PVSM, Indian military officer
 Vikramjit Singh Chaudhary, Indian politician, member of the Sixteenth Punjab Legislative Assembly elected from Phillaur Assembly constituency
 Vikramaditya Singh, Indian politician, member of the Thirteenth and Fourteenth Himachal Pradesh Legislative Assembly elected from Shimla Rural Assembly constituency and a cabinet minister in the Government of Himachal Pradesh

See also

 St. Paul's School
 The Doon School
 Daly College
 Mayo College
 Scindia School
 Rajkumar College, Raipur
 Rajkumar College, Rajkot
 Eton College

References

External links

 
 Old Cottonians Association
 The Schools Globe, a community whose members are from 15 boarding schools of India, thus forming 'The Prestigious Schools Club' (Bishop Cotton School – Shimla)
 Cottonians Connect, a website created by the Cottonian fraternity

Universities and colleges in Himachal Pradesh
Boarding schools in Himachal Pradesh
Schools in Colonial India
Education in Shimla
Schools in Shimla district
Educational institutions established in 1859
1859 establishments in India
Christian schools in Himachal Pradesh
British-era buildings in Himachal Pradesh